The Border women's cricket team is the women's representative cricket team for the South African region of Border. They compete in the Women's Provincial Programme and the CSA Women's Provincial T20 Competition.

History
Border Women first appeared in the Simon Trophy in the 1951–52 season, playing in the tournament until the 1975–76 season. They next appeared in the Women's Inter-Provincial Trophy in 1997–98, and have played in the tournament ever since. Their best finish came in the 2004–05 season, when they reached the final, but lost to Gauteng by 64 runs.

In more recent years, they gained promotion to the top tier of the tournament in the 2016–17 season after going unbeaten in the initial group stage before finishing 5th in the knockout rounds. They were relegated in the 2018–19 season, before immediately regaining promotion the following season, then being relegated again in 2020–21.

They have also competed in the CSA Women's Provincial T20 Competition since its inception in 2012–13. They achieved their best finish in that season, topping Group B to qualify for the knockout stages, where they lost in the semi-final but won the third-place play-off.

Players

Current squad
Based on squad announced for the 2021–22 season. Players in bold have international caps.

Notable players
Players who have played for Border and played internationally are listed below, in order of first international appearance (given in brackets):

  Nolu Ndzundzu (2000)
  Shafeeqa Pillay (2004)
  Angelique Taai (2005)
  Moseline Daniels (2010)
  Akhona Nyiki (2011)
  Ayabonga Khaka (2012)
  Sinalo Jafta (2016)
  Anneke Bosch (2016)
  Zintle Mali (2018)

Honours
 CSA Women's Provincial Programme:
 Winners (0): 
 Best finish: Runners-up (2004–05)
 CSA Women's Provincial T20 Competition:
 Winners (0):
 Best finish: 3rd (2012–13)

See also
 Border (cricket team)

References

Women's cricket teams in South Africa
Cricket in the Eastern Cape